Johnny Dean Robinson (born February 14, 1959) is a former American football player. He was a defensive tackle for the Oakland / Los Angeles Raiders. He attended Louisiana Tech University.

References

1959 births
Living people
American football defensive tackles
Los Angeles Raiders players
Louisiana Tech Bulldogs football players
Oakland Raiders players
People from Jonesboro, Louisiana
Players of American football from Louisiana